KDRN 1230 AM is a radio station licensed to Del Rio, Texas. The station broadcasts a Spanish Variety format and is owned by Jorge and Ana Suday, through licensee Suday Investment Group Inc.

References

External links
La Unica 1230 Facebook
KRCM's official website

DRN
Radio stations established in 1947
1947 establishments in Texas